Sir Francis Edward Evans  (4 April 1897 – 21 August 1983) was a British diplomat. Born in Belfast, Ireland, he was educated at the city's Belfast Royal Academy before being commissioned as a second lieutenant in the Royal Irish Rifles in December 1916. After serving in the First World War, he entered the civil service in 1919, and the following year completed a course for new consular entrants at the London School of Economics.

Between 1920 and 1926 Evans was the British vice-consul at New York City, and for another three years after that at Boston. In 1929, he was sent to Colón, Panama, remaining there until 1932, when he again returned to the United States. He subsequently spent five years as consul at Los Angeles, and after a period at the Foreign Office he returned to New York as consul general there, an appointment he held until 1950.

In 1951 Evans became under-secretary of state at the Foreign Office, and the following year he was appointed British ambassador to Israel, having become minister there the previous year. This was immediately followed in 1954 by his appointment as ambassador to Argentina, a post he held for three years before retiring.

From 1957 to 1965, Sir Francis was chairman of the Northern Ireland Development Council, and from 1962 and 1966 he also served as the agent for the Northern Ireland Government in Great Britain. He was also the recipient of honorary degrees from the Queen's University of Belfast, the University of Ulster and Ripon College, Wisconsin, and was a deputy lieutenant of Belfast.

For many years Sir Francis served on the Board of Governors of his old school Belfast Royal Academy.

Sir Francis's wife, Mary, Lady Evans, whom he married in 1920, died in 1976. Sir Francis died seven years later. There were no children of the marriage.

1897 births
1983 deaths
Military personnel from Belfast
Deputy Lieutenants of Belfast
British Army personnel of World War I
Royal Ulster Rifles officers
Knights Grand Cross of the Order of the British Empire
Knights Commander of the Order of St Michael and St George
People educated at the Belfast Royal Academy
Ambassadors of the United Kingdom to Argentina
Ambassadors of the United Kingdom to Israel
Members of HM Diplomatic Service
20th-century British diplomats